Dragica Mitrova (born 5 November 1987) is a Macedonian handball player for ŽRK Metalurg and the Macedonian national team.

References

1987 births
Living people
Macedonian female handball players
Beach handball players